Yerba santa or hierba santa, meaning "sacred herb" in Spanish, can refer to:

Hoja santa (Piper auritum)
Species of the genus Eriodictyon, including Eriodictyon californicum and Eriodictyon crassifolium

Spanish words and phrases